The 2019 Ladbrokes UK Open was a darts tournament staged by the Professional Darts Corporation. It was the seventeenth year of the tournament where players compete in a single elimination tournament to be crowned champion. The tournament was being held for the sixth time at the Butlin's Resort in Minehead, England, between 1–3 March 2019, and has the nickname, "the FA Cup of darts" as a random draw is staged after each round following the conclusion of the third round until the final.

Gary Anderson was the defending champion after defeating Corey Cadby 11–7 in the 2018 final. He was making his first public appearance since having to withdraw from both the 2019 Masters and the 2019 Premier League due to a persistent back injury, whilst Cadby was absent from this year’s competition due to visa problems. However, Anderson lost 8–10 in the fourth round to Steve Beaton.

Nathan Aspinall won his first PDC major title, beating Rob Cross 11–5 in the final.

Prize money
The prize fund increased from last year's edition to £450,000.

Change
In a significant change of format, the tournament has increased from 128 to 160 participants. Also, the ProTour UK Open Qualifiers have been scrapped in favour of a new system. All 128 PDC Tour Card holders automatically qualify, along with the Top 16 from the 2018 PDC Challenge Tour, plus 16 qualifiers from the Riley's Qualifiers taking place in early 2019. Due to Corey Cadby‘s withdrawal from the competition the field is reduced to 159 players who will now compete in this year’s tournament.

Format
The 159 participants will enter the competition incrementally, with 63 players entering in the first round, with match winners joining the 32 players entering in the second and third rounds to leave the last 64 in the fourth round.

No players are seeded.
A random draw is held for each of the following rounds following the conclusion of the third round.
All matches in the first, second and third rounds will be played over best of 11 legs.
All matches in the fourth, fifth, sixth rounds and quarter-finals will be played over best of 19 legs.
All matches in the semi-finals and final will be played over best of 21 legs.
Eight boards will be used for matches in the first, second, third and fourth rounds.
Four boards will be used for matches in the fifth round.
Two boards will be used for matches in the sixth round.
One board will be used for all the matches in the quarter-finals, semi-finals and final.

Qualifiers

Number 1–32 of the PDC Order of Merit (receiving byes into fourth round)

Number 33–64 of the PDC Order of Merit (receiving byes into third round)

Number 65–96 of the PDC Order of Merit (receiving byes into second round)

Number 97–128 of the PDC Order of Merit (starting in first round)

PDC Challenge Tour qualifiers (starting in first round)
The top 16 ranked players from the 2018 Challenge Tour Order of Merit who didn't have a Tour Card for the 2019 season qualified for the first round.

Rileys amateur qualifiers (starting in first round)
16 amateur players will qualify from 16 Riley's Sports Bar qualifiers held across the UK between 26 January and 24 February.

Draw

Friday 1 March

First round (best of eleven legs)

Second round (best of eleven legs)

Third round (best of eleven legs)

Fourth round (best of nineteen legs)

Saturday 2 March

Fifth round (best of nineteen legs)

Sixth round (best of nineteen legs)

Sunday 3 March

Quarter-finals (best of nineteen legs)

Semi-finals and final

References

UK Open
UK Open
UK Open
UK Open